Hiram Merritt Barton (December 18, 1856 – December 11, 1928) was an American businessman and politician.

Born in El Monte, California, his father was Ben Barton, who was a physician, businessman, and politician. Hiram Merritt Barton was responsible for the development of the San Bernardino Valley. Barton served in the California State Assembly for the 79th district from 1887 to 1889 as a Democrat. From 1905 to 1907 Barton served as mayor of San Bernardino, California. Barton died in San Bernardino.

See also 
 History of San Bernardino, California

References

Further reading

External links 
 

1856 births
1928 deaths
People from El Monte, California
Businesspeople from California
Mayors of San Bernardino, California
Democratic Party members of the California State Assembly
19th-century American politicians